Sir John Cunningham  (born 1949) is a British professor of nephrology at University College London Medical School and the Royal Free Hospital. He is a former physician to the Queen.

Biography
John Cunningham was born in 1949 and educated at Magdalen College School, Oxford, Trinity Hall, Cambridge (BA, 1970) and St John's College, Oxford (BM, BCh, 1973; DM, 1988). He also trained at Washington University School of Medicine, St. Louis, USA.

He became professor of nephrology at UCL Medical School, London and the Royal Free Hospital. He holds appointments at The London Clinic, and the King Edward VII Hospital, London.

He was Head of the Medical Household to Queen Elizabeth II from 2005-2014, and also occupied the position of Physician to the Queen. On stepping down, he was knighted by Queen Elizabeth II as a KCVO.

Selected publications
Achieving therapeutic targets in the treatment of secondary hyperparathyroidism.
New Vitamin D analogs and changing therapeutic paradigms.

See also
List of honorary medical staff at King Edward VII's Hospital for Officers

References

1949 births
Living people
People educated at Magdalen College School, Oxford
Alumni of Trinity Hall, Cambridge
Alumni of St John's College, Oxford
21st-century British medical doctors
Knights Commander of the Royal Victorian Order
Place of birth missing (living people)
Physicians of the Royal Free Hospital